The Philippine Army (PA) (Tagalog: Hukbong Katihan ng Pilipinas; in literal English: Army of the Ground of the Philippines; in literal Spanish: Ejército de la Tierra de la Filipinas) is the main, oldest and largest branch of the Armed Forces of the Philippines (AFP), responsible for ground warfare and  had an estimated strength of 101,000 soldiers backed by 100,000 ready reserves. The service branch was established on December 21, 1935, as the Philippine Commonwealth Army. The Philippine Army has engaged in many conflicts including the ongoing Communist rebellion in the Philippines, the Moro conflict and, alongside other national military forces, in conflicts of international scope.

The Commanding General of the Philippine Army is its professional and overall head. Its main headquarters (Headquarters Philippine Army or HPA) is located at Fort Andres Bonifacio, Metro Manila.

Background

Philippine Revolution (1896–1898) 

After three centuries of Spanish rule there were calls for social reforms and an end to the perceived oppressive friar rule. In 1896, Andres Bonifacio founded the Katipunan to prepare his band of Filipinos for armed revolt against the Spanish government. The Katipunan formed an army of insurgents.

On March 22, 1897, almost a year after the outbreak of hostilities between the Katipuneros and the Spanish troops, Emilio Aguinaldo was elected as revolutionary president in the Tejeros Convention and revolutionary forces were organized into the Philippine Revolutionary Army (PRA). General Artemio Ricarte was named Captain General. This date marks the founding day of the PRA, and is considered by the Armed Forces of the Philippines to be the establishment date of the Philippine Army.

On November 1, the Republic of Biak-na-Bato was established, with the PRA as its military arm. That republic was dissolved on December 14 by the Pact of Biak-na-Bato, with Aguinaldo and other senior leadership going into exile in Hong Kong. During the exile period, some elements of the PRA remained active in the Philippines under the Central Executive Committee established by Francisco Macabulos. On May 19, 1898, during the Spanish–American War, Aguinaldo returned to the Philippines, rekindled the revolution, declared independence from Spain, and became President of the First Philippine Republic which was established during the lull following Spanish surrender to American forces in the Philippines.

Philippine–American War (1899–1902)

The 1898 Treaty of Paris formalized the end of the Spanish–American War, with one of its provisions being cession of the Philippines to America by Spain. Shortly thereafter, the Philippine–American War erupted between that nascent republic and occupying American forces, eventually resulting in American victory and the disbanding of the PRA.

During the final years of the Philippine–American War, with the notable successes by the all-Filipino Macabebe Scouts cavalry squadron (raised in 1899) under U.S. command against the PRA, the American President Theodore Roosevelt officially sanctioned the raising of the Philippine Scouts (PS) as part of the United States Army, with full effect starting from October 1901. Earlier, in August that same year, came the colonial civil government's decision to found the Philippine Constabulary (PC) as the national gendarmerie force for law enforcement. Both of these organizations and their victories over the PRA; the Scouts were integrated into the U.S. Army, and the Constabulary gradually took over the responsibility for suppressing hostile forces' activities from United States Army units. This contributed to ending the conflict in 1902, even as resistance continued (inclusive of the Muslims of the south, resulting in the Moro Rebellion) through 1914.

Starting in 1910, one Philippine Scout soldier was sent to the United States Military Academy each year. Several of these graduates who had served with the Scouts, along with PC officers, formed part of the first officer corps of the revitalized Philippine Army established in 1935.

World War I (1914–1918)

In 1917 the Philippine Assembly created the Philippine National Guard with the intent to join the American Expeditionary Force. By the time it was absorbed into the National Army it had grown to 25,000 soldiers. However, these units did not see action. The first Filipino to die in World War I was Private Tomas Mateo Claudio who served with the U.S. Army as part of the American Expeditionary Forces to Europe. He died in the Battle of Chateau Thierry in France on June 29, 1918. The Tomas Claudio Memorial College in Morong Rizal, Philippines, which was founded in 1950, was named in his honor.

Post-WWI (1918–1935)
The Philippine National Guard unit of the U.S. Army was deactivated following World War I, then formally disbanded in 1921. During most of the Interwar period, spanning about 20 years from 11 November 1918 to 1 September 1939, the Philippines had no armed forces other than the Philippine Scouts, the Constabulary, and some semimilitary units which were generally privately organized and had no connection with conventional military forces.

History (1935–)

Commonwealth Period (1935–1946) 
The Philippine Army of today was initially organized under the National Defense Act of 1935  (Commonwealth Act No. 1) that formally created the Armed Forces of the Philippines. The act specified that insofar as may be practicable, original appointments by the President in grades above third lieutenant should be made from among former holders of reserve commissions in the United States Army, from among former officers of the Philippine Scouts and Constabulary.

After the establishment of the Philippine Commonwealth on November 15, 1935, President Manuel L. Quezon sought the services of General of the Army Douglas MacArthur (also Philippine Army Field Marshal) to evolve a national defense plan. The official rebirth of the Philippine Army occurred with the passage of Commonwealth Act No. 1, approved on December 21, 1935, which effected the organization of a Council of National Defense and of the Army of the Philippines. The act set forth the organizational structure of the army in some detail, set forth enlistment procedures, and established mobilization procedures. With this act, the AFP was officially established.

The development of the new Philippine Army was slow. The year 1936 was devoted to the building of camps, organization of cadres, and the special training of instructors, drawn largely from the Constabulary, which joined the new force as the Constabulary Division. The commander of the Philippine Department provided Philippine Scouts as instructors and detailed U.S. Army officers to assist in the inspection, instruction, and administration of the program. By the end of the year instructors had been trained and camps established.

The first group of 20,000 men was called up on January 1, 1937; and by the end of 1939 there were 4,800 officers and 104,000 men in the reserves. Infantry training was given at camps scattered throughout the Philippines; field artillery training was concentrated in the vicinity of the U.S. Army's Fort Stotsenburg near Angeles, about fifty miles north of Manila, and specialized training was given at Fort William McKinley just south of Manila. Coast artillery instruction was carried on at Fort Stotsenburg and at Grande Island in Subic Bay by personnel supplied largely by the American commander at Corregidor.

With the threat of war with Japan becoming imminent, on July 26, 1941, a new U.S. command in the Far East was created, known as the United States Army Forces Far East (USAFFE) under the command of General MacArthur. On the same date, U.S. President Franklin D. Roosevelt, issued a Presidential Order (6 Fed. Reg. 3825) which called the Philippine Army into the service of the Armed Forces of the United States. The Presidential Order did not order all the military forces of the Philippine government into the service of the United States Armed Forces; only those units and personnel indicated in orders issued by a general officer of the United States Army were mobilized and made an integral part of the United States Army Forces Far East (USAFFE), and only those members of a unit who physically reported for duty were inducted.  With an annual appropriation of 16 million pesos, the mobilized units trained new Filipino members in defending the nation and protecting its people.

World War II 

When World War II broke out in December 1941, two regular and ten reserve divisions of the Philippine Army undertook the defense of the Philippines. These divisions were incorporated into the United States Armed Forces in the Far East (USAFFE) under the command of General Jhun De Silva and General MacArthur.

Japanese forces invaded the Philippines after the bombing of Pearl Harbor on the island of Oahu on December 7, 1941. At this time, two regular and ten reserve divisions of the Philippine Army undertook the defense of the Philippines. This included North Luzon Force (under then Major General Jonathan M. Wainwright), South Luzon Force activated December 13, 1941 under Brig. Gen. George M. Parker Jr., the Visayan-Mindanao Force under Colonel W.F. Sharp in the southern islands (61st, 81st, and 101st Divisions plus three other regiments), and the Reserve Force. North Luzon Force included the 11th, 21st, and 31st Divisions, all reserve. South Luzon Force include the 1st (regular) Division, and the 41st, 51st, and 71st (reserve) Divisions. These divisions were incorporated into the United States Army Forces in the Far East (USAFFE).

The equipment of these units included: Renault FT tank (prewar training only); 75mm SPM (manned by PA and PS personnel); Canon de 155 mm GPF; Canon de 155 C modèle 1917 Schneider 75 mm Gun M1917; 2.95 inch QF Mountain gun; 3-inch gun; 6-pounder naval gun; Stokes Mortar; Brandt mle 27/31; Canon d'Infanterie de 37 modèle 1916 TRP; M2 Browning machine gun; M1917 Browning machine gun; M1919 Browning machine gun; M1918 Browning Automatic Rifle; M1917 Enfield rifle; M1903 Springfield rifle; Thompson submachine gun; and the M1911 pistol.

After the Battle of Bataan, the Japanese began the siege and Battle of Corregidor. Defending forces included regiments of the Harbor Defenses of Manila and Subic Bays, the 4th Marine Regiment and other Philippine, U.S. Army and Navy units and soldiers. Japanese forces landed at Corregidor on May 5, 1942. The island's fall led to the surrender of all defending Filipino and American forces on May 6, 1942. About 4,000 of the 11,000 American and Filipino prisoners of war from the island were marched through the streets of Manila to incarceration at Fort Santiago in Intramuros and Bilibid Prison in Muntinlupa, Rizal, which had become Japanese camps.

With the fall of Corregidor, Filipino and U.S. forces under U.S. command surrendered. After the surrender, thousands of Filipinos formerly under U.S. command (especially the former Visayan-Mindanao Force, which had seen little combat) evaded Japanese confinement and hid in the jungle. Every major island had guerrilla groups; Luzon had a dozen, including the Communist Huks. After initial clashes based on religious and political rivalries order was gradually restored, with most willing to trust the United States to grant independence in time. Many of these groups worked under the control of General Douglas MacArthur's General Headquarters, Southwest Pacific Area. The Japanese occupation of the Philippines saw repeated combat between the Japanese imperial forces, their collaborators and Filipino guerrillas. The American and Allied liberation force which began landing on October 17, 1944, was aided by local Filipino soldiers and recognized guerrillas in the liberation of the Philippines.

President Sergio Osmeña and Major General Basilio J. Valdes ordered the re-establishment of the army. The general headquarters of the Philippine Army and the United States Army Forces in the Far East moved to Tacloban, Leyte on October 23. From October 17, 1944, to September 2, 1945, local Philippine Constabulary troops, guerrilla units and the American liberation forces fought Imperial Japanese and Kempeitai troops which were supported by the Bureau of Constabulary and Makapili militia.

After the restoration of the Commonwealth of the Philippines on October 20, 1944, President Sergio Osmena, the government, military officials and cabinet returned from exile in the United States.

After the war, four military areas were activated to take the place of military districts. The Armed Forces was reorganized which gave birth to the four major services of the Armed Forces. Headquarters National Defense Forces was renamed General Headquarters Armed Forces of the Philippines.

Post-war period 

Service of the Philippine Army as part of the United States Army terminated as of midnight, June 30, 1946, by authority of General Order #168, U.S. Army Forces, Western Pacific.  The next day, on July 1, President Manuel Roxas issued Executive Order No. 94 s. 1947 which, among other things, reorganized the Philippine Army into a service branch of what was now called the Armed Forces of the Philippines. This resulted in the formation of the Philippine Air Force and reformation of the Philippine Navy as separate organizations after long years as part of the Philippine Army.

In the early fifties and the mid-sixties, the Philippine government extended a helping hand to war-torn countries as part of its commitment as member of the United Nations.

1950 would see the new army not just fighting Communist groups in Luzon but from August of that year, even the Korean People's Army and their allies in the People's Liberation Army in the Korean War as PA Battalion Combat Teams (BCTs) forming the bulk of the Philippine Expeditionary Forces to Korea formed part of the UN forces, led by the US, that fought in the conflict. The decade saw the raising of the first active division of the Army, the 1st Infantry Division. With the victory over the Huks later in the 50s, the BCTs became active duty infantry battalions. Formed in the same time was the 1st Scout Ranger Regiment, and in 1962 the PA raised its airborne and special forces formation, the Special Forces Regiment (Airborne) following the traditions of the US Army Special Forces (the Green Berets) and the 11th Airborne Division that helped liberate Southern Luzon and Manila at the closing stages of the Japanese occupation of the country.

It would only take until the 1970s and the Communist and Muslim rebellions that would force the PA into the establishment of its 2nd Infantry Division, which led to the raising of more infantry divisions all over the country, as well as the formal raising of the Army's Special Operations Command and what is now today the Armor Division. The Philippine Army was also involved in major conflicts worldwide, such as the Korean War, the Vietnam War, the War on terror, the Persian Gulf War and the Iraq War, as well as missions with the United Nations, such as the United Nations Disengagement Observer Force in Golan Heights and the United Nations Mission in East Timor.  By the 2000s, the Army acquired a small aviation capability for transport purposes, with plans to include attack and transport helicopters, a rocket artillery battery unit, and a land-based missile battery system unit.

Rank structure

Officer

Enlisted

Organization
The Philippine Army is headed by the Chief of the Army, attaining the rank of Lieutenant General. He is assisted by the Vice-Commander of the Philippine Army, and the Chief of Staff, Philippine Army in charge on organizational and administrative matters, both holding the ranks of Major General. The Philippine Army consists of 11 infantry divisions, 1 armor division, 1 combined arms brigade, 1 artillery regiment, 5 engineering brigades, 1 aviation regiment, and 7 combat support units which are spread throughout the Philippine Archipelago.

Leadership
Commander-in-Chief: President Bongbong Marcos
Secretary of National Defense: Secretary Carlito G. Galvez Jr.
National Security Adviser: Secretary Eduardo Año
Presidential Adviser for Military Affairs: Secretary Roman A. Felix
Chief of Staff of the Armed Forces of the Philippines: General Andres C. Centino, PA
Commanding General of the Philippine Army: Lieutenant General Romeo S. Brawner Jr., PA

Regular Units
The Philippine Army has several regular units (Infantry, Armor & Cavalry, Artillery, Special Forces, Intelligence, Signalling and Engineering units) and five regular support units (Medical, Ordinance, Quartermaster, Finance and Adjutant General units) dedicated to both counter-insurgency and conventional army operations.
 Infantry
 Armor and Cavalry
 Artillery
 Special Forces
 Military Intelligence
 Corps of Engineers
 Signal Corps
 Medical Services
 Ordinance Service
 Quartermaster Service
 Finance Service
 Adjutant General Service

Commands
The Army has 4 support commands, and is responsible for the handling of reserves, creating doctrines and training operations, and overall installation and combat support in the army's operations.
 Reserve Command
 Training and Doctrine Command – Training Command, Philippine Army, established 1986, was reorganised as TRADOC effective March 1, 1995.
 Army Support Command
 Installation Management Command (Provisional)

Infantry Divisions

The Army has a total of 11 infantry divisions, composed of 2-4 infantry brigades. The infantry divisions are also part of the 6 Unified Commands of the AFP, and are responsible for overall infantry operations within their respective areas of responsibility.

   1st Infantry "Tabak" Division
   2nd Infantry "Jungle Fighter" Division
   3rd Infantry "Spearhead Troopers" Division
   4th Infantry "Diamond" Division
   5th Infantry "Star" Division
   6th Infantry "Kampilan" Division
   7th Infantry "Kaugnay" Division
   8th Infantry "Storm Trooper" Division
   9th Infantry "Spear" Division
  10th Infantry "Agila" Division
   11th Infantry "Alakdan" Division

Combined Arms Brigade
The Army has one combined arms brigade, and also serves as a rapid deployment force, combined in one major unit, and serves as a major maneuver unit, capable of rapid mobilization and conventional warfare. 
 1st Brigade Combat Team "Aegis"

Armor, Cavalry and Mechanized Support units
The Army has one armor division, comprising two mechanized brigades, six mechanized battalions, seven separate cavalry squadrons, a maintenance unit and an aviation arm. The unit is responsible for mechanized fire support, as well as the deployment of mobile infantry brigades and armored reconnaissance units.
 Armor "Pambato" Division (formerly Mechanized Infantry Division)
 1st Mechanized Infantry (Maasahan) Brigade
 2nd Mechanized Infantry (Magbalantay) Brigade
1st Tank (Masikan) Battalion
1st Mechanized Infantry (Lakan) Battalion
2nd Mechanized Infantry (Makasag) Battalion 
3rd Mechanized Infantry (Makatarungan) Battalion
4th Mechanized Infantry (Kalasag) Battalion
5th Mechanized Infantry (Kaagapay) Battalion
6th Mechanized Infantry (Salaknib) Battalion 
1st Cavalry (Tagapanguna) Squadron
2nd Cavalry (Kaagapay) Squadron
3rd Cavalry (Masigasig) Squadron
1st Cavalry (Rapido) Company (S)
2nd Cavalry (Tagapaglingkod) Company (S)
3rd Cavalry (Katapangan) Company (S)
4th Cavalry (Karangalan) Company (S)
5th Cavalry (Kasangga) Company (S)
6th Cavalry (Paghiliugyon) Company (S)
7th Cavalry (Masasanigan) Company (S)
Armor Maintenance (Masinop) Battalion

Artillery units
The Army has one artillery regiment, comprising nine artillery battalions and six artillery battery units, responsible of overall artillery fire support to the army's maneuver units.

Army Artillery "King of Battle" Regiment (AAR)
1st Field Artillery Battalion
2nd Field Artillery Battalion
3rd Field Artillery Battalion
4th Field Artillery Battalion
5th Field Artillery Battalion
6th Field Artillery Battalion
7th Field Artillery Battalion
8th Field Artillery Battalion
9th Field Artillery Battalion
10th Field Artillery Battalion (155mm Self Propelled)
1st Field Artillery (155mm Self Propelled) Battery
2nd Field Artillery (155mm Self Propelled) Battery
1st Multiple Launch Rocket System Battery (1MLRS Btry)
2nd Multiple Launch Rocket System Battery (2MLRS Btry) 
1st Land-based Missile System Battery (1LBMS Btry) 
1st Air Defense Artillery Battery (1ADA Btry)
2nd Air Defense Artillery Battery (2ADA Btry)

Engineering units
The Army has 5 engineering brigades, responsible for overall engineering support, construction of army facilities, and counter-mobility operations.
 51st Engineer Brigade
 52nd Engineer Brigade
 53rd Engineer Brigade
 54th Engineer "Sarangay" Brigade
 545th Engineer "Peaceseeker" Battalion
 547th Engineer "Agila" Battalion
 549th Engineer "Kapayapaan" Battalion
 Engineer "Primemover" Support Company
 Headquarters and Headquarters "Provider" Company
 55th Engineer "Mobilizer" Brigade
 500th Engineer Combat Battalion
 551st Engineer Battalion
 553rd Engineer Battalion
 554th Engineer Battalion

Aviation unit
The Army has one aviation regiment, which is part of the Army's Armor Division, responsible for reconnaissance and airborne operations such as aerial transport and medical evacuation duties. The unit is also undergoing significant upgrades as the Army slowly fulfills its modernization efforts and will soon be responsible for future air support and improved transport operations.
 Aviation "Hiraya" Regiment (Part of the Armor Division)

Combat Support units
The Army has seven combat support units, responsible for overall combat support operations, ranging from communications, logistics, intelligence, ordinance disposal, enforcement, signalling, and services operations.
 Army Signal Regiment
 Civil-Military Operations Regiment
 1st Logistics Support Brigade
 191st Military Police Battalion
 Army Intelligence Regiment
 Army Explosive Ordnance Disposal Battalion
 Headquarters & Headquarters Service (Tagapaglaan) Battalion

Combat Service Support units
The Army has 14 combat service support units, responsible for overall organizational support; as well as public, information, and military law affairs; security and escort operations; and medical, dental and religious services.
 Finance Center Philippine Army
 Philippine Army Band (formally known as Headquarters Philippine Army Band)
 Philippine Army Nurse Corps
 Philippine Army Medical Corps
 Philippine Army Dental Service
 Philippine Army Security and Escort Battalion
 Philippine Army Public Affairs Office
 The Armor School (Kahusayan)
 Philippine Army Medical Administrative Corps
 Philippine Army Veterinary Corps
 Judge Advocate General Service
 Corps of Professors
 Army Chief Chaplain Service

Special forces units
The Philippine Army has three special operations regiments dedicated to special operations. These units report directly to the AFP Special Operations Command (SOCOM):
AFP Special Operations Command (SOCOM)
1st Scout Ranger Regiment
Special Forces Regiment (Airborne)
 Light Reaction Regiment

Bases
The Army has being the dominant branch of the AFP, has maintained a large number of bases throughout the country compared to other branches. They have used these bases in support of their operations nationwide.

Equipment 

The Philippine Army has made use of its existing equipment to fulfill its mandate while modernization projects are underway. The Republic Act No. 7898 declares the policy of the State to modernize the military to a level where it can effectively and fully perform its constitutional mandate to uphold the sovereignty and preserve the patrimony of the republic. The law, as amended, has set conditions that should be satisfied when the defense department procures major equipment and weapon systems for the army.

References

External links 

 Official website